The 2019 Mid-American Conference women's soccer tournament was the postseason women's soccer tournament for the Mid-American Conference held from November 3 through November 10, 2019. The quarterfinals were held at campus sites. The semifinals and finals took place at Mickey Cochrane Stadium in Bowling Green, Ohio, home of the Bowling Green Falcons, the highest remaining seed in the tournament following the quarterfinal matches. The eight-team single-elimination tournament consisted of three rounds based on seeding from regular season conference play. The Bowling Green Falcons were the defending champions, and they successfully defended their title with a 3–1 penalty shootout win over the Eastern Michigan in the final.  The title was the fourth for the Bowling Green women's soccer program and the second for head coach Matt Fannon.

Bracket

Source:

Schedule

Quarterfinals

Semifinals

Final

Statistics

Goalscorers 
4 Goals
Kristin Hullibarger (Eastern Michigan)

3 Goals
Alivia Milesky (Ohio)

2 Goals
Amanda Cripps (Eastern Michigan)

1 Goal
Sarah Allen (Bowling Green)
Marcy Barberic (Buffalo)
Abigail Brown (Akron)
Taylor Caridi (Buffalo)
Katie Coleman (Central Michigan)
Peighton Cook (Ball State)
Katie Cox (Bowling Green)
Nikki Cox (Bowling Green)
Sydney Leckie (Ohio)
Sabrina McNeill (Eastern Michigan)
Mackenzie Ortman (Bowling Green)
Kaitlyn Walsh (Buffalo)
Chelsee Washington (Bowling Green)
Kennedy White (Bowling Green)

All-Tournament team

Source:

MVP in bold

References 

Mid-American Conference Women's Soccer Tournament
2019 Mid-American Conference women's soccer season